"Ringo Starr" is a song by Italian band Pinguini Tattici Nucleari. It was released by Sony Music on 6 February 2020 as the first single from the reissue of fourth studio album Fuori dall'hype.

The song was the band's entry for the Sanremo Music Festival 2020, the 70th edition of Italy's musical festival, where it placed 3rd in the grand final. "Ringo Starr" peaked at number 3 on the weekly Italian FIMI Singles Chart and was certified triple platinum in Italy.

Music video
The music video for the song was released on YouTube on 6 February 2022, to accompany the single's release. Directed by William9, the video is a parody of the film Back to the Future, with the frontman Riccardo Zanotti acting as Marty McFly during the school ball scene.

Track listing

Charts

Weekly charts

Year-end charts

Certifications

References

2020 singles
2020 songs
Sanremo Music Festival songs